Pacencia Valencia Hidalgo Laurel (née Hidalgo y Valencia; April 30, 1889 – January 1, 1963) was the wife of Philippine President Jose P. Laurel and the third First Lady of the Philippines and the only First Lady to serve under the Japanese-occupied Philippines during World War II.

Marriage and family
She eloped and married Jose P. Laurel, a fellow Tanauan native who was then a fresh high school graduate, on April 9, 1911. The couple had nine children:
 José Laurel Jr. (August 27, 1912 – March 11, 1998)
 José Laurel III (August 27, 1914 – January 6, 2003)
 Natividad Laurel-Guinto (born December 25, 1916)
 Sotero Laurel II (September 27, 1918 – September 16, 2009)
 Mariano Antonio Laurel (January 17, 1922 – August 2, 1979)
 Rosenda Pacencia Laurel-Avanceña (born January 9, 1925)
 Potenciana "Nita" Laurel-Yupangco (born May 19, 1926)
 Salvador Laurel (November 18, 1928 – January 27, 2004)
 Arsenio Laurel (December 14, 1931 – November 19, 1967)

Their marriage lasted until Laurel's death in 1959.

First Lady
She held out both as first lady and mother to the nation during the dark days of the war. Laurel refused to live in Malacañang and opted for their family home in Paco, Manila. Like Mrs. Quezon, she involved herself in socio-civic and charitable activities. The best compliment paid her can be found in the dedication of her husband's book Bread and Freedom (1952) which states: "To my beloved and understanding wife, who shared uncomplainingly, all the hardships that are the lot of one who tries to serve the fatherland."

In March 1945, President Laurel, together with his family, Camilo Osías, Benigno Aquino Sr., Gen. Tomas Capinpin, and Jorge B. Vargas, evacuated to Baguio. Shortly after the city fell, they traveled to Tuguegarao, where they embarked a bomber plane to Japan via Formosa (now Taiwan) and Shanghai, China. Her husband, while in Japan, issued an Executive Proclamation on August 17, 1945, which declared the dissolution of the Second Philippine Republic.

Her husband and son Jose III were later imprisoned in Japan from September 15, 1945, and would stay there until July 23, 1946. Mrs. Laurel and her other children were then brought back home to Manila on November 2, 1945.

References

1889 births
1960 deaths
Filipino Roman Catholics
People from Batangas
People from Paco, Manila
Pacencia
First Ladies and First Gentlemen of the Philippines
Spouses of presidents of the Philippines